Platen is a German-language surname. People with the surname include:

 Angelika Platen (born 1942), German photographer 
 August von Platen-Hallermünde (1796-1835), German poet and dramatist
 Baltzar von Platen (inventor) (1898–1984), Swedish inventor
 Dubislav Friedrich von Platen (1714–1787), Prussian officer in Frederick the Great's army
 Filip Julius Bernhard von Platen (1732–1805), Swedish-German politician and field marshal
 Flockina von Platen (1903–1984), German actress

German-language surnames